Sob Evariste Dibo (born 27 December 1968) is an Ivorian former professional footballer who played as an attacking midfielder.

Dibo was part of the Ivorian national team who reached the quarter-finals of the 1998 African Cup of Nations.

References

External links
 
 

1968 births
Living people
Footballers from Abidjan
Ivorian footballers
Association football forwards
Ligue 2 players
FC Martigues players
Grenoble Foot 38 players
AC Ajaccio players
Championnat National players
TFF First League players
Adanaspor footballers
Danish 1st Division players
Vejle Boldklub Kolding players
Primeira Liga players
Rio Ave F.C. players
S.C. Braga players
Ivory Coast international footballers
Ivorian expatriate footballers
Expatriate footballers in France
Expatriate footballers in Turkey
Expatriate men's footballers in Denmark
Expatriate footballers in Portugal
Ivorian expatriate sportspeople in France
Ivorian expatriate sportspeople in Turkey
Ivorian expatriate sportspeople in Portugal